Amblytelus sinuatus is a species of ground beetle in the subfamily Psydrinae. It was described by Blackburn in 1892.

References

Amblytelus
Beetles described in 1892